Mehdi Aminrazavi (born September 22, 1957) is an Iranian scholar of philosophy and mysticism. He is the Kurt Leidecker Chair in Asian Studies and a professor of philosophy and religion as well as director of the Center for Middle Eastern Studies Program at the University of Mary Washington.

Biography
Born in Mashhad, Iran, Aminrazavi studied at the University of Washington in Seattle and received his bachelor's degree in Architecture and city planning and a master's in philosophy. He then transferred to Temple University where he received his master's in religious studies and a Ph.D. in philosophy of religion. He has been teaching at the University of Mary Washington since 1990.

Affiliations
Aminrazavi is a member of a number of prestigious national and international philosophical and religious organizations including the American Academy of Religion, the American Philosophical Association and the Middle Eastern Society of America.

Works
 Philosophy, Religion and the Question of Intolerance (1997)
 Suhrawardi and the School of Illumination (1997)
 Philosophy, Religion, and the Question of Intolerance (1997) with David Ambuel
 An Anthology of Philosophy in Persia with Seyyed Hossein Nasr
 The Islamic Intellectual Tradition in Persia (1996) with Seyyed Hossein Nasr
 The Wine Of Wisdom: The Life, Work, And The Legacy Of Omar Khayyam (2005)
 Islamic Philosophy & Theology: An Online Textbook for Colleges (2010).

References

1957 births
Living people
People from Mashhad
Iranian scholars
Iranian expatriates in the United States
Researchers of Persian literature
University of Washington alumni
Temple University alumni
University of Mary Washington faculty
Iran's Book of the Year Awards recipients